Het Vrije Volk was a Dutch social-democratic daily newspaper. It was the successor, after World War II, of the socialist daily Het Volk. The paper appeared legally 1 March 1945 in Eindhoven. From 28 January 1946, all subdivisions of the newspaper were united and a national edition was introduced. For a time, it was the biggest newspaper in the Netherlands and at its peak it had over 300 editors and reporters. After 1958, the number of subscribers decreased rapidly.

The newspaper disappeared in 1970 as a national newspaper from Amsterdam, only regional editions remained and at the end of 1971 only Rotterdam was its home base. The last edition entitled Het Vrije Volk appeared on 30 March 1991 and it was merged with the Rotterdams Nieuwsblad into the Rotterdams Dagblad. That newspaper was merged with the Algemeen Dagblad in 2005.

Het Volk

Het Volk was a socialist newspaper from the Netherlands. It was published in Amsterdam, beginning on 2 April 1900, by the Social Democratic Workers' Party (SDAP).

Preparations for publishing Het Volk began in 1899. Financial support was provided by the older Social Democratic Party of Germany. A publishing company was established under the name De Arbeiderspers. Its first Editor-in Chief was the head of the SDAP, Pieter Jelles Troelstra. In 1903, after some disagreements arose, he was replaced by the journalist, Pieter Lodewijk Tak.

In 1902, a contest was held to find an artist for the front-page cartoon in the weekly Sunday supplement. The winner was Albert Hahn, who was later signed to a permanent contract. In 1931, the paper moved into a new building, designed by Jan Buijs, which came to be known as the "Red Castle". A sister edition called Vooruit (Forward), was published in The Hague under the direction of Simon Carmiggelt.

After the German invasion in 1940, the paper's management vainly attempted to maintain some degree of independence. However, on 20 July 1940, Meinoud Rost van Tonningen of the National Socialist Movement began to oversee their operations. After the war, it was re-established under a new name: Het Vrije Volk.

Chief editors

External links

Articles from Het Volk @ Delpher

1945 establishments in the Netherlands
1991 disestablishments in the Netherlands
Defunct newspapers published in the Netherlands
Dutch-language newspapers
Mass media in Eindhoven
Mass media in Rotterdam
Daily newspapers published in the Netherlands
Newspapers established in 1945
Publications disestablished in 1991